Mansoa difficilis is a species of neotropical liana in the family Bignoniaceae. It is native to Brazil, Argentina, and Paraguay. Its flowers range in colour from fuchsia to purple.

References

difficilis
Vines